Godber is a surname. Notable people with the surname include:

Baron Godber, title created in the Peerage of the United Kingdom on 23 January 1956 for Frederick Godber
Sir George Godber, GCB (1908–2009), Chief Medical Officer for Her Majesty's Government in England from 1960 to 1973
John Godber (born 1956), English dramatist, known mainly for his innovative theatre and observational comedies with an edge
The Lord Godber of Willington (1914–1980), British Conservative politician and cabinet minister
Lennie Godber, character in the BBC sitcom Porridge
Peter Godber (born 1922), a former Chief Superintendent of the Royal Hong Kong Police Force convicted for corruption
Peter Godber (Canadian football) (born 1994), a Canadian football offensive lineman
Sir Godber Evans, central character in two novels by British novelist Tom Sharpe